Joe Bravo (born September 10, 1971 in Long Branch, New Jersey) is a jockey in American Thoroughbred horse racing. The son and grandson of jockeys, he began his professional career in Thoroughbred flat racing at Calder Race Course in Miami Gardens, Florida during the latter end of 1988.

Nicknamed "Jersey Joe", Bravo has won 22 riding titles in his career at racetracks in New Jersey—13 at Monmouth Park and nine at the Meadowlands. He got his big break in 1997 when he rode Formal Gold to his victories that year. Bravo has won the Jersey Shore Breeders' Cup Stakes five times, including three straight from 2004 through 2006.

In 2019, Joe Bravo won the Breeders' Cup Distaff, his first victory after 21 career mounts at the Breeders' Cup.

In June 2021, Bravo announced that he would be relocating to ride in Southern California, starting at Santa Anita Park. He will be represented by agent Matt Nakatani, the son of retired jockey Corey Nakatani. Bravo has declined to ride in New Jersey since the start of the 2021 Monmouth Park meet in disagreement with new rules regarding the use of the riding crop implemented by the New Jersey Racing Commission. He returned in 2022.

References

 Joe Bravo NTRA Profile

Year-end charts

1971 births
Living people
American jockeys
People from Eatontown, New Jersey
People from Long Branch, New Jersey
People from Aventura, Florida